Yaakov  Bodo (born 28 March 1931) is an Israeli actor and comedian.

Biography
Yaakov (Yankele) Bodo was born in Romania in 1931 and spoke only Yiddish until the age of 7. He immigrated with his family to Israel in 1950 and settled in Afula. His grandparents were Zionists who helped establish Kfar Hasidim and Kiryat Haroshet (now part of Kiryat Tiv'on) after they emigrated to Mandate Palestine in 1933.

Bodo is married with three children and has five grandchildren. He is married to his wife and personal manager, Ester, whom he met in Afula.

Acting and film career

A year after his arrival in Israel, Bodo joined the Israel Defense Forces, where he first assembled and led the Southern Command Troupe. Following the disbanding of that troupe in 1954, he was assigned the creation of the Northern Command troupe, which he led for three-and-a-half years.

Meanwhile, he came up with his "Moishe Ventilator" character.  Upon his release, he starred in a theater show by that name which was a hit in the 1950s—running more than a thousand times—and which was eventually made into a film version.

Bodo performed on the stages of the institutionalized theaters Zira Theatre, Habima Theatre, Haifa Theatre as well as commercial theater, mostly in Yiddish, where he was successful. In 1992, he joined the Yiddish-Shpiel theatre, where he mostly performs in leading roles. Among the more notable plays he performed in were Maagal HaGir (lit. "The Chalk Circle"), and Karnafim (lit. "Rhinoceroses").

In 1964 he performed in Ephraim Kishon's  film Sallah Shabati, alongside Chaim Topol, Gila Almagor, Zaharira Harifai, Shaike Levi, and Arik Einstein. The film was a satirical portrayal of the poor conditions and the integration of the Jewish refugees from Arab lands living in the maabara.

In 1966, Bodo's character, Moishe Ventilator, was picked up and made into a parody film by the same name, where, under the direction of Uri Zohar, Bodo, accompanied by Shaike Ophir and the Gashah HaHiver trio, portrayed a frugal private whose cost-cutting ideas include cutting on maps in the operation room, which are coveted by a spy who infiltrates the IDF ranks.

In 1967, he performed in Kishon's film Ervinka (Starred by Chaim Topol), about an incorrigible layabout who becomes involved in a robbery of the Israeli lottery under the cover of making a documentary.

Bodo also performed The Fox in the Chicken Coop, Nahche and The General, Millionaire in Trouble, My Margo, Take When They Give, Five Five, A Miracle in The Village, Just Not on Saturday, Not a Word to Morgenstern, and others.

Awards and recognition
Bodo was awarded the 2009 Israeli Theater Award lifetime achievement award, the Edith and Israel Pollack Award for 1999, and the Lerner Yiddish Foundation Award for 2000.

See also
Theater of Israel
Cinema of Israel

References

External links
 
 Yaakov Bodo Biography page on habama.co.il
 Yaakob Bodo Links on DMC, Haifa University

1931 births
Living people
Israeli Ashkenazi Jews
Romanian emigrants to Mandatory Palestine
Israeli people of Romanian-Jewish descent
Romanian Ashkenazi Jews
Israeli male film actors
Israeli male stage actors
Israeli male comedians
Jewish Israeli comedians
20th-century Israeli comedians
People from Afula
Yiddish-speaking people